Alfred Postles (16 June 1903 – 11 August 1976) was a New Zealand cricketer. He played 31 first-class matches for Auckland between 1924 and 1943.

Alf Postles was a batsman and occasional off-spin bowler who captained Auckland for three seasons, in each of which they won the Plunket Shield: 1933–34, 1937-38 and 1938–39. His best match was against Canterbury in the 1937-38 Plunket Shield, when he made his highest score, 103, and took his best figures, 4 for 20, and Auckland beat Canterbury by an innings and 193 runs. He later served as president of the Auckland Cricket Association and of the New Zealand Cricket Council.

Postles was educated at Auckland Grammar School. He married Marjorie Jeffries in Auckland on 27 January 1930. He served as a lieutenant in the New Zealand Army during World War II, stationed in New Zealand.

His son Bryce played for Auckland in the 1950s.

See also
 List of Auckland representative cricketers

References

External links
 

1903 births
1976 deaths
New Zealand cricketers
Auckland cricketers
Cricketers from Auckland
People educated at Auckland Grammar School
New Zealand cricket administrators
North Island Army cricketers